F.C. Marigot is a Martinois football club based in Marigot. The club competes in the Saint-Martin Senior League, the top tier of Martinois football.

References

External links 
 Official Website
 FFF Profile

Marigot